Vevi (before 1926: Μπάνιτσα - Banitsa, before 1928: Μπάνιτσα - Banitsa; Macedonian and , Banica or Banitsa) is a village located in the municipal unit of Meliti in Florina regional unit, Macedonia, Greece. The village is passed by two national roads which lead to Thessaloniki, Florina, Amyntaio, and Kozani. Additionally, it has a railway station on the line between Florina and Thessaloniki.

Economy

It is mainly a farming community and is the site of the Achlada, the Vevi lignite mines from Upper Miocene.

History
The city dates back to Roman times. Archeological finds from this period, such as the marble torso of a male statue, are housed at the Archaeological Museum of Florina.

The local church St. Nicolas was built and painted in 1460. There were 132 Christian households in the village in the first half of the 17th century. In 1845 the Russian slavist Victor Grigorovich recorded Banci as mainly Bulgarian village.

According to local tradition, the settlers who laid the foundation of the modern village included various people from the region such as Greeks, Bulgarians, Turks, etc. There were two Bulgarian schools in the beginning of 20th century.

In 1913, with the conditions of the Treaty of Bucharest, when this part of Macedonia became part of Greece, and after the Balkan Wars, a lot of locals emigrated to Bulgaria. The village was renamed Vevi in 1926. Following World War II as well as the Greek Civil War it saw more exodus on the part of the town's non-Greek inhabitants.

Demographics
Vevi had 806 inhabitants in 1981. In fieldwork done by Riki Van Boeschoten in late 1993, Vevi was populated by Slavophones. The Macedonian language was spoken in the village by people over 30 in public and private settings. Children understood the language but mostly did not use it.

Transport
The settlement is served BY Regional and Proastiakos servics to Thessaloniki and Florina.

Notable people 
Antigonos Choleris (-1913), Greek chieftain of the Macedonian Struggle and soldier of the Balkan Wars.
Stavros Kotsopoulos, Greek chieftain of the Macedonian Struggle and soldier of World War II.
Peter Daicos, Australian AFL footballer whose father migrated to Melbourne, Australia.

See also
 Battle of Vevi (1912)
 Battle of Vevi (1941)

References

External links
 Florina Official Site.
 Website operated by expatriates.

Populated places in Florina (regional unit)